Gustavo Ávila (born June 14, 1938, in Caracas, Venezuela) is a retired jockey in Thoroughbred horse racing. He is best known as the jockey who  rode Canonero II to victory in two of the 1971 U.S. Triple Crown series, the Kentucky Derby and Preakness Stakes. Among his other accomplishments, Avila was the winner of the first Clásico del Caribe (1966) with Victoreado and was the leading rider at La Rinconada Hippodrome for five years.

References
 Profile of Gustavo Avila (Spanish language)
 Statistics and video of Gustavo Avila's 1971 Kentucky Derby, Churchill Downs

1938 births
Living people
Venezuelan jockeys
Sportspeople from Caracas